Farmer Not So John was a popular music group based in Nashville, Tennessee, that was often categorized as alternative country. With members Mack Linebaugh, Brian Ray, Sean Keith and Richard McLaurin, the band released two recordings on Compass Records.

Members
Mack Linebaugh (a.k.a. Mack Starks) (vocals, guitar)
Brian Ray (bass)
Richard McLaurin (guitar)
Sean R. Keith (drums)

Discography
Farmer Not So John (1997)
Receiver (1998)

External links
Compass Records
Mack Starks official website

Rock music groups from Tennessee
American alternative country groups